Goyang KB Kookmin Bank FC was a South Korean football club based in the Seoul satellite city of Goyang. It played in the National League, the third tier of Korean football. The club was officially dissolved in November 2012.

K-League Membership 
Kookmin Bank FC was founded in September 1969 and competed in the various amateur football competitions at the time. The club enjoyed success in tournaments such as the Korea Semi-Professional Football League (winners in 1978) and the President's Cup (winners in 1978 and 1983) before becoming founder members of the K-League, the professional football league in South Korea, in 1983.

The club's stay in the professional ranks was a short one, as it finished 5th out of the five teams in the first year. When it came in 8th out of the eight teams in 1984 the decision was made for the club to return to the amateur ranks.

After the K-League 
Upon returning to the amateur ranks, the club returned to winning ways and managed President's Cup triumphs in 1986, 1990 and 1995. It also won the 3rd edition of the Industrial Amateur Football championship in 1993, a tournament they would win again in 1996.

The financial crisis that struck South Korea in 1997 saw the club temporarily wound up, with the official decision to pull the plug on the team coming on December 31, 1997. After two years out of the game, Kookmin Bank reconstituted their club on February 28, 2000 and the team returned to the amateur ranks, eventually winning a sixth President's Cup crown in 2003.

Life at K2 Level 
Organised league football at amateur level came about in 2003 with the establishment of the National League, a competition with ten members, of which Kookmin Bank were one. Initially based in Gimpo, the club won the first stage of the 2003 championship and then moved its home base to Goyang and the team's name was changed to Goyang Kookmin Bank for the second stage where they finished runners-up on goal difference. They defeated the reserve team of military side Sangmu 5-4 on aggregate in the playoff final to win the league. They retained their championship crown in 2004 with a 4-1 aggregate win over Gangneung City FC after having again won the first stage of the league season.

Despite a lacklustre 2005 season, the club bounced back to win the 2006 championship (now rebranded the National League], triumphing 2-1 on aggregate in the final after winning the first stage of the season.

Promotion Controversy 
It was planned that, subject to meeting certain financial requirements, the winner of the National League in 2006 would be promoted to the K-League. However Goyang Kookmin Bank caused controversy by winning the league but declining to move up. Team owners Kookmin Bank cited a Korean law where banks in Korea were not allowed to be involved in profitable ventures outside of banking which of course a professional football team could be. However the more likely reason is the large financial losses that most K-League teams endure each year as the league struggles for sponsorship money and suffers through low crowd numbers. On top of that any National League champion seeking promotion from the second tier is required to pay an 'entry fee' of around 2 million US dollars simply to join the league. Goyang Kookmin Bank received several threats from the League ranging from being thrown out of the competition, to fines, to point deductions for the upcoming 2007 season. In the end the side received a points deduction penalty, to be split into ten point deductions in the first and second stages of the 2007 season.

Current team squad

Honours

Domestic competitions

League
 National League
 Winners (3): 2003, 2004, 2006
 Runners-up (2): 2011, 2012

Cups
 National League Championship
 Winners (1): 2009
 Runners-up (1): 2007
 National Football Championship
 Winners (1): 1978
 President's Cup
 Winners (6): 1973, 1983, 1986, 1990, 1995, 2003
 Runners-up (4): 1982, 1988, 1991, 2005

Statistics 

1: Goyang KB Kookmin Bank was docked 10 points due to rejecting of promotion.

See also 
 List of football clubs in South Korea
 KB Kookmin Bank
 FC Anyang

External links 
  Goyang KB page at the National League website
  Goyang KB at ROKfootball.com

 
Association football clubs established in 1969
Association football clubs disestablished in 2012
KB Kookmin Bank FC
KB Financial Group Inc
1969 establishments in South Korea
2012 disestablishments in South Korea